The following are the records of Brazil in Olympic weightlifting. Records are maintained in each weight class for the snatch lift, clean and jerk lift, and the total for both lifts by the Confederação Brasileira de Levantamento de Pesos (CBLP).

Current records
Key to tables:

Men

Women

Historical records

Men (1998–2018)

Women (1998–2018)

Notes

References
General
Brazilian records – Men November 2022 updated
Brazilian records – Women November 2022 updated
Specific

External links
 CBLP web site
 Brazilian records

Brazil
records
Olympic weightlifting
weightlifting